Alexandra Patrusha Mina Swire, Baroness Swire (born 18 January 1963), commonly known as Sasha, is an English author and journalist, and the wife of the former Conservative Party Minister of State Hugo Swire, Baron Swire.

She is the writer of the 2020 memoir Diary of an MP's Wife.

Background
Descended from Devon gentry, Alexandra Nott is the only daughter of Sir John Nott, former Member of Parliament for St Ives and Secretary of State for Defence under Margaret Thatcher during the Falklands War, and his wife Miloska Vlahović, daughter of Yugoslav resistance leader Lujo Vlahović, of Slovenian extraction.

Her elder and younger brothers, Julian and William Nott, both attended Eton College, while she was educated at Cranborne Chase School. She then pursued further studies at St Martin's School of Art, where she was a contemporary of the fashion designer John Galliano.

Swire trained as a journalist and has a background in local journalism.

She sought selection for the Teignbridge parliamentary candidacy of 2005 won by Stanley Johnson. David Cameron wanted her to stand for a parliamentary seat for the Conservative Party again in 2009.

She voted Remain in the 2016 EU referendum.

Diaries
Swire's  book, Diary of an MP's Wife: Inside and Outside Power, was published on 24 September 2020. It is Swire's diary of 20 years, and contains insights into the private lives of Conservative politicians, including David Cameron, George Osborne, Dominic Raab, Theresa May, Michael Gove and Boris Johnson. It was serialised in The Times prior to its release.

Petronella Wyatt, a friend, reported that Swire was initially distressed by some of the sensational extracts, hinting that they had somehow been "distorted". According to her book, Cameron once ventured to say to Swire: "The scent you are wearing is affecting my pheromones. It makes me want to grab you and push you into the bushes and give you one."

The book was criticised by Karen Pollock, chief executive of the Holocaust Educational Trust, for its "casual, blasé use" of the term "Jewish lobby". The Jewish Chronicle opined that Swire had written "antisemitic-sounding comments" in relation to the term.

Reflecting in 2021 on the publication of her diaries, Swire wrote, "I was totally unprepared for the headlines that followed. It felt at times as if my wings were made of wax and feathers, that the sun had melted them and there was no shortage of hands pressing down on my head to keep me from resurfacing from a deep ocean. To be confronted with such a distorted picture of my real self was challenging to say the least."

Personal life
She married Hugo Swire on 12 December 1996 at the chapel of the Royal Hospital Chelsea, where Lord Michael Cecil was best man. She was her husband's parliamentary assistant for 18 years until he stood down from the House of Commons.

The couple live in London SW6 and have two daughters, born in 1997 and 2001.

Honours
  Cross of Merit, Order pro Merito Melitensi

Bibliography
 Diary of an MP's Wife: Inside and Outside Power (Little, Brown Book Group, 2020)

See also
 Burke's Landed Gentry

References

1963 births
Living people
Alumni of Saint Martin's School of Art
British people of Slovenian descent
English people of Slovenian descent
English diarists
Sasha Swire
People educated at Cranborne Chase School
People from Islington (district)
Writers from London
Spouses of British politicians
British women journalists
Wives of knights
Spouses of life peers
Recipients of the Order pro Merito Melitensi